Parliamentary elections were held in Hungary between 8 and 15 December 1926. The result was a victory for the Unity Party, which won 161 of the 245 seats in Parliament. István Bethlen remained Prime Minister.

Electoral system
Prior to the election the electoral system was changed again. In the previous elections there had been 219 constituencies, of which 195 were openly elected single-member constituencies, 20 of which were secretly elected single-member constituencies, and four of which were secretly elected multi-member constituencies. For this election there were 199 openly elected single-member constituencies and 11 secretly elected multi-member constituencies electing a total of 46 seats.

Results

The total number of registered voters was 2,231,972, but only 1,504,227 were registered in contested seats.

By constituency type

Notes

References

Hungary
Elections in Hungary
Parliamentary
Hungary

hu:Magyarországi országgyűlési választások a Horthy-rendszerben#Az 1926-os választások